A  gin pole is a supported pole that uses a pulley or block and tackle on its upper end to lift loads.  The lower end is braced or set in a shallow hole and positioned so the upper end lies above the object to be lifted.  The pole (also known as a mast, boom, or spar) is secured with three or more guy-wires. These are manipulated to move the load laterally, with up and down controlled by the pulley or block. In tower construction, a gin pole can also be “jumped” up the completed sections of a tower to lift the higher sections into place.

The gin pole is derived from a gyn, and considered a form of derrick, called a standing derrick or pole derrick, distinguished from sheers (or shear legs) by having a single boom rather than a two-legged one.

Gin poles are also used to raise loads above structures too tall to reach with a crane, such as placing an antenna on top of a tower/steeple, and to lift segments of a tower on top of one-another during erection.  When used to create a segmented tower, the gin pole can be detached, raised, and re-attached to the just-completed segment in order to lift the next.  This process of jumping is repeated until the topmost portion of the tower is completed. They can also hold a person if strong enough (thus opening stage uses, such as in magic shows).

Gin poles are mounted on trucks as a primitive form of mobile crane, used for lifting and relocating loads, and salvage operations in lieu of a more sophisticated wrecker.

References

External links

Notes & drawings
tower contractor's description with diagram
gin pole regulations in California
gin pole failure leads to lawsuit april 15, 1948 in philadelphia

Tools
Cranes (machines)
Lifting equipment